Dedham may refer to:

Places

United Kingdom 
Dedham, Essex, a village in England
Dedham Vale, a designated Area of Outstanding Natural Beauty in the surrounds of Dedham, Essex

United States 
Dedham, Iowa, a city in Carroll County
Dedham, Maine, a town in Hancock County
Dedham, Massachusetts, the county seat of Norfolk County
Dedham, Wisconsin, an unincorporated community in Douglas County

People
Molly Dedham, XM Radio host

Other
Dedham Pottery, a pottery company